The Fannefjord Tunnel is a  long subsea road tunnel in Molde Municipality in Møre og Romsdal county, Norway. The tunnel is part of County Road 64 and it goes under the Fannefjorden, connecting the island of Bolsøya to the mainland at Årø, where it intersects with the European route E39 highway.

The tunnel was part of the Skåla Fixed Link, which also included new roads on the island of Bolsøya and the Bolsøy Bridge from Bolsøya to Skåla Peninsula. The tunnel opened on 24 May 1991 and was partially financed as a toll road. Toll collection remained until 15 June 2005. The tunnel replaced the Molde–Bolsøy Ferry and the Lønset–Grønnes Ferry.

References

Road tunnels in Møre og Romsdal
Subsea tunnels in Norway
Norwegian County Road 64
Buildings and structures in Molde
Tunnels completed in 1991
1991 establishments in Norway